Haskell Buster Boggs (April 17, 1909 – May 30, 2003) was an American cinematographer. 

Boggs worked on many of Jerry Lewis' early solo films including The Delicate Delinquent (1957), Rock-A-Bye Baby, The Geisha Boy (both 1958), Don't Give Up the Ship (1959), The Bellboy and Cinderfella (both 1960). He was fired by Lewis over a disagreement during The Ladies Man (1961). He returned to cinematography replacing Milton Krasner on Red Line 7000 (1965) but made just one additional theatrical film, Young Fury (1965), before moving into television.

He was nominated for five Primetime Emmy Awards in the category Outstanding Cinematography for his work on the television program Bonanza and the television film Where Pigeons Go to Die. 

Boggs died in May 2003 of heart disease in Burbank, California, at the age of 94. He was buried in Forest Lawn Memorial Park.

References

External links 

1909 births
2003 deaths
Filmmakers from Oklahoma
American cinematographers
Burials at Forest Lawn Memorial Park (Hollywood Hills)
University of Southern California alumni